Eddie Gribbon (January 3, 1890 – September 29, 1965) was an American film actor. He appeared in more than 180 films from the 1910s to the 1950s. Gribbon began working in Mack Sennett films in 1916 and continued through the 1920s. He usually had significant roles in two-reel films, but his roles in feature films were lesser ones.

Gribbon was the brother of actor Harry Gribbon.

Selected filmography

 Salome vs. Shenandoah (1919) - Audience Spectator/ Soldier
 Down on the Farm (1920) (with Louise Fazenda and Harry Gribbon) - Banker's Henchman
 Love, Honor and Behave (1920) - The Lawyer's Left-Hand Man
 A Small Town Idol (1921) - Bandit Chief
 Home Talent (1921) - Stranded Actor
 Molly O' (1921) (with Mabel Normand) - Danny Smith
 Playing with Fire (1921) - Danny Smith
 The Crossroads of New York (1922) - Star Boarder
 Alias Julius Caesar (1922) - 'Nervy' Norton
 A Tailor-Made Man (1922) - Russell
 The Village Blacksmith (1922) - The Village Gossip
 Captain Fly-by-Night (1922) - Sgt. Cassara
The Fourth Musketeer (1923) - Mike Donovan
 Crossed Wires (1923) - Tim Flanagan
 Double Dealing (1923) - Alonzo B. Keene
 The Victor (1923) - Porky Schaup, Boxer
 Hoodman Blind (1923) - Battling Brown
 After the Ball (1924) - A Crook
 Jack O'Clubs (1924) - Spike Kennedy
 The Border Legion (1924) - Blicky
 East of Broadway (1924) - Danny McCabe
 Code of the West (1925) - Tuck Merry
 Forty Winks (1925) - Tough guy (uncredited)
 The Mansion of Aching Hearts (1925) - Fritz Dahlgren
 Just a Woman (1925) - Oscar Dunn
 Seven Days (1925) - Burglar
 The Limited Mail (1925) - 'Spike' Nelson
 Under Western Skies (1926) - Reed
 The Bat (1926) - Detective Anderson
 Desert Gold (1926) - One-Found Kelley
 The Flaming Frontier (1926) - Jonesy
 Bachelor Brides (1926) - Glasgow Willie - aka Limehouse Herbert
 The Flying Mail (1926) - 'Gluefoot' Jones
 There You Are! (1926) - Eddie Gibbs
 Tell It to the Marines (1926) - Corporal Madden
 Man Bait (1927) - Red Welch
 Convoy (1927) - Eddie
 The Callahans and the Murphys (1927) - Jim Callahan
 Night Life (1927) - Nick
 Cheating Cheaters (1927) - Steve Wilson
 Streets of Shanghai (1927) - Swede
 Buck Privates (1928) - Sgt. Butts
 Nameless Men (1928) - Blackie
 Stop That Man! (1928) - Bill O'Brien
 Bachelor's Paradise (1928) - Terry Malone
 United States Smith (1928) - Sgt. Steve Riley
 Gang War (1928) - Blackjack
 Fancy Baggage (1929) - Steve
 From Headquarters (1929) - Pvt. Murphy
 Two Weeks Off (1929) - Sid Winters
 Two Men and a Maid (1929) - Adjutant
 Twin Beds (1929) - Red Trapp
 They Learned About Women (1930) - Brennan
 Dames Ahoy! (1930) - Mac Dougal
 Song of the West (1930) - Sergeant Major
 Born Reckless (1930) - Bugs
 Good Intentions (1930) - Liberty Red
 Not Exactly Gentlemen (1931) - Bronco Dawson
 Mr. Lemon of Orange (1931) - Walter (uncredited)
 Law and Order (1932) - Elder's Deputy (uncredited)
 Hidden Gold (1932) - Big Ben Cooper
 Arizona to Broadway (1933) - Max Rigby (uncredited)
 Search for Beauty (1934) - Adolph Knockler
 I Like It That Way (1934) - Joe
 I Can't Escape (1934) - Regan - Beat Cop
 The Cyclone Ranger (1935) - Duke
 Stone of Silver Creek (1935) - Masher (uncredited)
 Rio Rattler (1935) - Soapy
 She Couldn't Take It (1935) - Detective (uncredited)
 Rip Roaring Riley (1935) - Sparko - Henchman
 The Shadow of Silk Lennox (1935) - Lefty Sloan - Henchman
 Love on a Bet (1936) - Donovan - Escaped Convict
 The Millionaire Kid (1936) - Hogan
 The Phantom Rider (1936, Serial) - Sheriff Mark
 Bulldog Edition (1936) - Mr. Patrick McManus (uncredited)
 I Cover Chinatown (1936) - Truck Driver
 Too Many Wives (1937) - Owner of Oscar's Diner (uncredited)
 You Can't Buy Luck (1937) - Chuck (uncredited)
 There Goes My Girl (1937) - Mike - Whelan's Strong Arm Man (uncredited)
 San Quentin (1937) - Singing Convict 51310 (uncredited)
 The 13th Man (1937) - Iron Man
 Super-Sleuth (1937) - Policeman (uncredited)
 The Big Shot (1937) - Soapy - aka Mr. Stratford Enright III
 Big City (1937) - Slow-Witted Policeman (uncredited)
 Live, Love and Learn (1937) - Turkish Bath Attendant (uncredited)
 Mannequin (1937) - Detective (uncredited)
 Wise Girl (1937) - Fight Referee (uncredited)
 The Spy Ring (1938) - Sergeant Who Threatens Mayhew (uncredited)
 Maid's Night Out (1938) - Tim Hogan
 On the Great White Trail (1938) - Constable Patsy
 Little Orphan Annie (1938) - Monk
 Idiot's Delight (1939) - Cop (uncredited)
 Fast and Furious (1939) - Hennessy - a Policeman (uncredited)
 Another Thin Man (1939) - Baggage Man (uncredited)
 Edison, the Man (1940) - Cashier (uncredited)
 Gold Rush Maisie (1940) - Gus - Customer (uncredited)
 The Leather Pushers (1940) - Pete Manson
 The Great Dictator (1940) - Tomanian Storm Trooper
 Li'l Abner (1940) - Barney Bargrease
 Mr. District Attorney (1941) - Detective in Café (uncredited)
 Pot o' Gold (1941) - Expressman (uncredited)
 Honky Tonk (1941) - Pallbearer (scenes deleted)
 The Secret Code (1942, Serial) - First Mate (uncredited)
 Sleepy Lagoon (1943) - A Lug (uncredited)
 Blazing Guns (1943) - Cactus Joe
 Mr. Muggs Steps Out (1943) - Butch Grogan
 Canyon City (1943) - Deputy Frank
 Busy Buddies (1944, Short) - The Champ (uncredited)
 Joe Palooka, Champ (1946) - Louie, the Louisiana Lion
 Gentleman Joe Palooka (1946) - Ziggy - Sparring Partner
 Mr. Hex (1946) - Blackie, a Henchman
 Joe Palooka in the Knockout (1947) - Canvasback
 Joe Palooka in Fighting Mad (1948) - Scranton
 Smart Woman (1948) - Man in Bar (uncredited)
 Joe Palooka in Winner Take All (1948) - Canvasback
 Smugglers' Cove (1948) - Digger, the Caretaker
 Street Corner (1948) - Mike - Taxi Driver (uncredited)
 Joe Palooka in the Big Fight (1949) - Canvasback
 Fighting Fools (1949) - Highball (uncredited)
 The Beautiful Blonde from Bashful Bend (1949) - Hoodlum (uncredited)
 Joe Palooka in the Counterpunch (1949) - Canvasback
 Joe Palooka Meets Humphrey (1950) - Canvasback
 Joe Palooka in Humphrey Takes a Chance (1950) - Canvasback
 Triple Trouble (1950) - Hobo Barton
 Joe Palooka in the Squared Circle (1950) - Canvasback
 Father's Wild Game (1950) - Delivery Man (uncredited)
 Joe Palooka in Triple Cross (1951) - Canvasback

References

External links

1890 births
1965 deaths
American male film actors
American male silent film actors
Male actors from New York City
Deaths from cancer in California
Burials at Calvary Cemetery (Los Angeles)
20th-century American male actors